LA-13 is a constituency of Azad Kashmir Legislative Assembly which is currently represented by the share of Muhammad Raffiq Nayyer and Nisaar Ansar Abdali.

Raffiq nayyer is elected as all jamu and kashmir reserved seat for teconcrates having status of an MLA Ansar abdali is a Jamu and kashmir government minister of health of .LA 13 covers the area of Khuiratta Tehsil in Kotli District of Azad Kashmir, Pakistan.

Kashmir needs a referendom one part of kashmir is occupied by India by force.

Election 2016

elections were held in this constituency on 21 July 2016.

Kotli District
Azad Kashmir Legislative Assembly constituencies